Hauter is a surname. Notable people with the surname include:

François Hauter (born 1951), French reporter
Rolf Hauter, South African Navy officer
Wenonah Hauter (born 1954), American environmentalist

Surnames of German origin